Seldom-Little Seldom is a community in the Canadian province of Newfoundland and Labrador. It was previously incorporated as a town prior to becoming part of the Town of Fogo Island through an amalgamation in 2011. The former town had a population of 444 in the Canada 2006 Census.

On March 1, 2011, the Town of Seldom-Little Seldom amalgamated with other communities to become the Town of Fogo Island.

Seldom was earlier called Seldom-Come-By.

See also 
 List of cities and towns in Newfoundland and Labrador

External links 
Town of Fogo Island

References 

Former towns in Newfoundland and Labrador
Populated places disestablished in 2011
Fogo Island, Newfoundland and Labrador
Road-inaccessible communities of Newfoundland and Labrador